HMAS Whyalla (J153/B252), named for the city of Whyalla was one of 60 Bathurst-class corvettes constructed during World War II and one of 20 built on Admiralty order but manned by personnel of and later commissioned into the Royal Australian Navy (RAN). The ship was sold to the Victorian Public Works Department at the end of the war, who renamed her Rip and used her as a maintenance ship. In 1984, she was purchased by Whyalla City Council, who put her on display as a landlocked museum ship in 1987.

Design and construction

In 1938, the Australian Commonwealth Naval Board (ACNB) identified the need for a general purpose 'local defence vessel' capable of both anti-submarine and mine-warfare duties, while easy to construct and operate. Construction of the prototype  did not go ahead, but the plans were retained.

The need for locally built 'all-rounder' vessels at the start of World War II saw the "Australian Minesweepers" (designated as such to hide their anti-submarine capability, but popularly referred to as "corvettes") approved in September 1939, with 60 constructed during the course of the war: 36 ordered by the RAN, 20 (including Whyalla) ordered by the British Admiralty but manned and commissioned as RAN vessels, and 4 for the Royal Indian Navy.

Whyalla was laid down by BHP at its Whyalla shipyard on 24 July 1940 as Yard Number 8. The corvette was launched on 12 May 1941 by Lady Barclay-Harvey, wife of the Governor of South Australia, and commissioned on 8 January 1942. Whyalla was the first ship built by the Whyalla shipyard. The ship was originally to be named Glenelg, for the Adelaide suburb of Glenelg. That name was later used by another Bathurst-class vessel.

Operational history

RAN
In 1942, the corvette worked supporting convoys off the south eastern Australian coast, and was in Sydney Harbour during the Japanese midget submarine attack of 31 May 1942. 12 days later, Whyalla was escorting a southbound convoy when the freighter Guatemala was torpedoed and sunk by Japanese submarine I-21, the only ship to be lost in a convoy escorted by Whyalla.

In December 1942, the corvette was assigned to New Guinea, where she performed convoy escort, hydrographic survey work, and was involved in the leadup to the Battle of Buna-Gona. On 2 January 1943, Whyalla and two small Australian survey ships, Stella and Polaris, were attacked by Japanese dive-bombers while in McLaren Harbour, Cape Nelson, New Guinea. The corvette received minor damage from near-misses, with two crew injured by shrapnel. The corvette continued survey work until relieved by sister ship Shepparton in April 1943. Whyalla proceeded to Milne Bay, and was present when the anchorage was attacked by a force of approximately 100 Japanese aircraft. Again, Whyalla was not seriously damaged, and the corvette assisted sister ships Kapunda and Wagga in the rescue and salvage effort.

Whyalla returned to Australia for refits in June 1943, and on completion was assigned to convoy duty off Australia's east coast, where she remained until February 1944. Between February and June, she was involved in anti-submarine patrols off Sandy Cape, then was again assigned to New Guinea. In December 1944, Whyalla was one of nine Australian Bathursts assigned to the British Pacific Fleet's 21st Minesweeping Flotilla. Whyalla spent the rest of the war performing minesweeping, escort, and anti-submarine duties with the British Pacific Fleet, as well as participating in the occupation of Okinawa from March to May 1944, and entering a short refit in June 1944. Following the conclusion of World War II, Whyalla spent a short time operating in Hong Kong before returning to Brisbane in October 1945. She was decommissioned on 16 May 1946.

The corvette received three battle honours for her wartime service: "Pacific 1942–45", "New Guinea 1942–44", and "Okinawa 1945".

Civilian service

Whyalla was sold to the Victorian Public Works Department on 10 February 1947. The corvette was modified for civilian service, renamed Rip, and towed to Melbourne, where she entered service as a lighthouse maintenance vessel at the entrance to Port Phillip Bay. The ship was in service until 1984, and was to be sold for scrap.

Maritime museum
When the Whyalla City Council learned that the corvette was to be scrapped, it negotiated to purchase the ship. Whyalla was purchased for $5,000 and sailed back to Whyalla with a volunteer crew of 11 and under her own steam in late 1984. Whyalla is one of only two Bathurst-class corvettes still in existence as museum ships; the other being HMAS Castlemaine.

Notes

Citations

References
Books

Journal and news articles

External links

 https://web.archive.org/web/20070926223414/http://home.vicnet.net.au/~mildura/corvettes_6.htm#Whyalla
 HNSA Ship Page: HMSA Whyalla 

Bathurst-class corvettes of the Royal Australian Navy
Lighthouse tenders of Australia
Museums in South Australia
Museum ships in Australia
Ships built in South Australia
Whyalla
World War II corvettes of Australia
1941 ships